Monica Wilson, née Hunter (3 January 1908 – 26 October 1982) was a South African anthropologist, who was professor of social anthropology at the University of Cape Town.

Life 

Monica Hunter was born to missionary parents in Lovedale in the Cape Colony, speaking Xhosa from childhood. She studied history at Girton College, Cambridge, before gaining a Cambridge doctorate in anthropology in 1934. Her thesis, the fieldwork for which was undertaken with the Pondo in the Eastern Cape between 1931 and 1933, was presented in the monograph Reaction to Conquest.

Marrying Godfrey Wilson in 1935, the pair undertook fieldwork with the Nyakyusa in Tanzania between 1935 and 1938. Their fieldwork was sponsored by the International African Institute,
Godfrey Wilson died in 1944. Monica taught at the University College of Fort Hare from 1944 to 1946 and at Rhodes University from 1947 to 1951. She was Professor of Social Anthropology at the University of Cape Town from 1952 until retirement in 1973.

She died in Hogsback, Cape Province at her home, which is now a research centre for the University of Fort Hare.

Works 

 
  with Godfrey Wilson
 
 (ed. with Leonard Thompson)

References

Further reading

External links 
 UCT Libraries Digital Collections – Monica and Godfrey Wilson Collection

1908 births
1982 deaths
People from Raymond Mhlaba Local Municipality
South African anthropologists
Alumni of Girton College, Cambridge
Academic staff of the University of Cape Town
Academic staff of Rhodes University
South African women scientists
South African women anthropologists
South African women academics
People associated with the Rhodes-Livingstone Institute
20th-century anthropologists